Tjenare Mollberg, hur är det fatt? (Dear Mollberg, what happened?) is No. 45 in the Swedish poet and performer Carl Michael Bellman's 1790 song collection, Fredman's Epistles. The epistle is subtitled "Till fader Mollberg rörande hans harpa, och tillika et slags ad notitiam at Mollberg led oskyldigt på Krogen Rostock" (To father Mollberg concerning his harp, and further a sort of ad notitiam that Mollberg innocently suffered at the Rostock tavern); the song is sometimes known under this name. It describes a fight in a tavern that starts when Mollberg innocently plays a Polska on his harp, leading his audience to assume it was propaganda for Poland. 

Scholars have noted that the epistle is the clearest exception to the rule that Bellman avoided international politics. The Rostock tavern's location has been debated; the evidence favours a city centre site in Stockholm's Gamla stan. The sound of Mollberg's harp is indicated in the song with onomatopoeic phrases.

Context

Song

Music and verse form 

The song has 9 verses, each consisting of 11 lines: 4 long, 4 short, 3 long. The rhyming pattern is AABB-CCDD-EEE. It is marked Allegretto, and is in  time. The melody is an ariette from the comic opera Silvain with libretto by Jean-François Marmontel and music by André Grétry. This was first put on in Paris in 1770, and the French performers brought it to Stockholm's Bollhus Theatre that same year. The musicologist James Massengale writes that the "poetic possibility" was for Bellman to set up a humorous contrast between the melody and the reality described in the epistle.

Lyrics 

The epistle was written sometime between 1773 and 1778.
The song, subtitled "Till fader Mollberg rörande hans harpa" (To father Mollberg concerning his harp), tells how the musician Mollberg, a member of Fredman's Order of Bacchus, had gone to the Rostock tavern to play "Drottningens polska i Polen, G dur" (The Queen of Poland's Polska in G major); the lyrics include onomatopoeic phrases suggestive of the plucking of harp strings. A shoe-mender tells him not to allude to "Polens affärer" (Poland's affairs). He explains to "my Maecenas", he drinks and talks "helt högt" (out loud) about Poland, and how no monarch can forbid him from playing his harp, as long as he has a string left. Two notaries, an old sergeant, and a dragoon guardsman call out to Mollberg to stop. A "cross-eyed" woman steps up and smashes his harp, bottles and glass. The shoe-mender hits Mollberg, and the epistle ends with a lament for the world's injustice and his innocent suffering; he vows to keep better company, and to "play for Bacchus [god of wine] and Venus [goddess of love] — kling klang — ", and asks Apollo [god of music] to accompany him, "Pling, plingeli plang!".

Reception and legacy 

Britten Austin calls the song a "famous ballad-epistle". The harpist Mollberg innocently plays a dance tune, which as the lyrics state is the "Queen of Poland, her Polska, in G Major". Britten Austin explains that this is "an action which is instantly assumed by a shoemaker, a sergeant, two notaries and a guardsman to have political innuendo". Mollberg replies that no monarch in the world can stop him playing; the result is that "his face is smashed in, and his harp, too". Britten Austin notes that Mollberg is accustomed to "rough nights" of this kind, as epistle 41 describes a morning after as Mollberg gets up "rubbing his bruises", while epistle 58 tells how a fellow member of the Order of Bacchus, Kilberg, meets his death in a tavern brawl, "His glass upset; / Beer from a barrel is dripping." 

The Bellman Society comments that while international politics rarely inspired Bellman to song, this epistle is the clearest exception. Poland had been divided up by the great powers of the Russian Empire, Prussia, and Austria; Mollberg's choice of a Polska was interpreted by the tavern guests as "propaganda for Poland". The Society states that Mollberg's complaint represents one of the first calls for freedom of expression in Swedish literature.

An earlier performance by Sven-Bertil Taube on his Fredmans Epistlar och Sånger, recorded 1959–1963, was re-released on an EMI-Svenska CD in 1983.

The location of the Rostock tavern has been debated. This interpretation is corroborated by the Stockholm City Museum's card register for old tavern names, which contains a remark on the card for the Västerlånggatan "Rostock": "Do not confuse this [city centre] Rostock with that in Fredman's ep. 45."

References

Sources

 
 
  (contains the most popular Epistles and Songs, in Swedish, with sheet music)
  (with facsimiles of sheet music from first editions in 1790, 1791)

External links 

 Text of epistle 45 at Bellman.net
 Parallel Swedish / German texts at Anacreon.de

 Authorised releases of recordings
 Performance by Björn Arahb and Pierre Ström, 1999 on YouTube (provided by The Orchard Enterprises)
 Performance by Martin Bagge, 2011 on YouTube (provided by Naxos of America)
 Performance by Folke Sällström, 2014 on YouTube (provided by Naxos of America)

1790 compositions 
Swedish songs
Fredmans epistlar